Marypark is a hamlet in Moray, Scotland.

References

Villages in Moray
Hamlets in Scotland